Nancy Beiman is a director, character designer, teacher, and animator. She attended the Character Animation program at CalArts.

Career

Animation
In 1986, Beiman cofounded Caged Beagle Productions with business partner Dean Yeagle. She then moved to Berlin, Germany where she directed and animated for  Film Productions. In 1989, she was a supervising animator at Steven Spielberg's Amblin' studio in London animating Miss Kitty in the feature film An American Tail: Fievel Goes West.

Beiman animated Mickey Mouse, Donald Duck, and Winnie the Pooh for many Disney projects beginning in 1982. She joined the Walt Disney Company full time as a supervising animator and development artist for A Goofy Movie (1995), Hercules (1997) and Treasure Planet (2002).

Nancy Beiman also animated on the feature film Snoopy: The Musical (1988), and early video game projects for Philips Sidewalk Studios The Crayon Factory and two other CDI that she directed, storyboarded, and co animated.

Her interviews with animation artists appeared in Cartoonist Profiles magazine from 1982 to 1995.

Teaching
Beiman taught storyboard at Sheridan College's Animation department in Canada from 2008 to 2018. Beiman previously taught animation at Savannah College of Art and Design, and taught animation, character design, layout, storyboard and gesture drawing at Rochester Institute of Technology, School of Film & Animation from 2004 to 2008. Beiman retired in 2022.

Books
Beiman is the author of two books on animation acting and storyboarding: Animated Performance. and Prepare to Board!.  In 2022, she published a book of autobiographical comics about her life during COVID, How I Finally Got to Live a Cat's Life: A Cartoon Diary 2020-2021.

Awards
Beiman was awarded a Golden Pencil for outstanding teaching at the 2D Or Not 2D Animation Festival in 2007. In 1984 she was awarded with the NCS Division Award in the field of Feature Animation.

References

External links
 
 
 The Demon Duck of Doom (Nancy Beiman's blog)
 Meet the Character Animator: NANCY BEIMAN article
 Interview with Beiman at FLIP animation magazine Retrieved March 2013

American animators
American storyboard artists
Canadian women animators
Canadian storyboard artists
American animated film directors
Canadian animated film directors
Living people
American women animators
American women film directors
Canadian women film directors
Year of birth missing (living people)
Walt Disney Animation Studios people